The three teams in this group played against each other on a home-and-away basis. Chile and Ecuador finished level on points, a play-off on neutral ground was played to decide who would qualify. The winner (Chile) qualified for the 1966 FIFA World Cup held in England.

Matches

 

 

 

 

 

Chile and Ecuador finished level on points, and a play-off on neutral ground was played to decide who would qualify.

Chile qualified.

Final Table

Team stats

Head coach:  Luis Álamos

Head coach:  Antonio Julio de la Hoz

External links
FIFA official page
RSSSF - 1966 World Cup Qualification
Allworldcup

2
1965 in Colombian football
1965 in Chilean football
1965 in Ecuadorian sport